Greig Lake is a resort village in the Canadian province of Saskatchewan within Census Division No. 17. It is on the eastern shore of Greig Lake in the Rural Municipality of Meadow Lake No. 588. The community is surrounded by Meadow Lake Provincial Park.

History 
Greig Lake incorporated as a resort village on January 1, 1983.

Demographics 

Government 
The Resort Village of Greig Lake is governed by an elected municipal council and an appointed administrator. The mayor is Dale Brander and its administrator is Joan Tatomir.

See also 
List of communities in Saskatchewan
List of municipalities in Saskatchewan
List of resort villages in Saskatchewan
List of villages in Saskatchewan
List of summer villages in Alberta

References 

Resort villages in Saskatchewan
Meadow Lake No. 588, Saskatchewan
Division No. 17, Saskatchewan